Murrurundi( ), is a rural town located in the Upper Hunter Shire, in the Upper Hunter region of New South Wales, Australia.

At the  the town had a population of 847 people. The town is almost completely surrounded by mountains of the Liverpool Range, and is located on the Pages River, a tributary of the Hunter River.

History and overview 
Prior to European settlement, the Murrurundi district was home to the Wanaruah and possibly the Kamilaroi Aboriginal people. 
The name "Murrurundi" is often erroneously thought to come from an Aboriginal word meaning "nestling in the valley". It does in fact mean "five fingers", a representation of the rock formation visible at the northern end of the township.

European settlement of the area began in the 1820s, and the town itself was established by the New South Wales government in 1840. In the same year, a local landholder, Thomas Haydon, established an adjacent private township called Haydonton. In the 1846 census, Murrurundi had a population of 52, while Haydonton had a total of 117. In 1913, the two neighbouring settlements were merged to create the modern-day town of Murrurundi.

Benjamin Hall, father of bushranger Ben Hall had a small farm in a valley near Murrurundi in 1839. He opened a butcher's shop at Haydonton in 1842. Ben Hall lived at Murrurundi with his family until the age of 13.

Operations ceased during the First World War.

Murrurundi is the nearest major town to the site of the Murulla rail accident, which occurred on 13 September 1926. 27 people were killed when runaway wagons smashed into a mail train.

Annual events include the rodeo and the King of the Ranges stockman challenge. There are only a few sporting facilities due to the low population. These sports are senior rugby league, touch football, swimming club and cricket.

Murrurundi was the main town of the former Murrurundi Shire local government area, which was abolished and its territory divided between two new, larger, shires. The town of Murrurundi is now part of Upper Hunter Shire.

In January 2019, Murrurundi ran out of water making it necessary for trucks to begin daily delivery of potable water.

In October 2019 it was announced that the Wilson Memorial Community Hospital would be demolished to make away for a new hospital.

Heritage listings 
Murrurundi has a number of heritage-listed sites, including:
 Main Northern railway: Murrurundi railway station
 Mount Street: Rosedale Cottage

Transport
The New England Highway runs through the town, and it is served by a rail service.

Murrurundi railway station is located on the Main North railway line,  from Sydney. The station opened in 1872 and consists of a substantial brick station-house with a passing loop and goods yard. There was also a locomotive depot for bank engines which lasted until the end of steam. It continues to be served by a daily rail service operated by a NSW TrainLink Xplorer train to and from Sydney and Armidale/Moree, trains will only stop at this station on request.

Climate

The latter has significantly cooler maximum temperatures (even when accounting for elevation) but also warmer minima, by virtue of being an exposed hilltop.

The town station commenced rainfall records in 1870; temperature averages and extremes from 1907 and 1965, respectively; whereas the gap station was not established until 2003.

References

External links

 Murrurundi Community Website

 
Suburbs of Upper Hunter Shire
Towns in the Hunter Region
Shale oil towns in New South Wales